The 2001 Volta a la Comunitat Valenciana was the 59th edition of the Volta a la Comunitat Valenciana road cycling stage race, which was held from 27 February to 3 March 2001. The race started in Puerto Sagunto and finished in Valencia. The race was won by Fabian Jeker of the  team.

General classification

References

Volta a la Comunitat Valenciana
2001 in road cycling
2001 in Spanish sport